John Milton Killits (October 7, 1858 – September 13, 1938) was a United States district judge of the United States District Court for the Northern District of Ohio.

Education and career

Born in Lithopolis, Ohio, Killits received an Artium Baccalaureus degree from Williams College in 1880, a Bachelor of Laws from Columbian University School of Law (now George Washington University Law School) in 1885, a Master of Laws from the same institution in 1886, and an Artium Magister degree from Williams College in 1887. He published a daily and weekly newspaper in Red Oak, Iowa from 1880 to 1883, and worked for the United States Department of War in Washington, D.C., starting March 1884, before becoming private secretary to General William Babcock Hazen, chief signal officer of the United States Army. He was in private practice in Bryan, Ohio from 1888 to 1904, also working as a prosecuting attorney of Williams County, Ohio from 1893 to 1899. He was a Judge of the Court of Common Pleas for the Third Ohio District from 1905 to 1910.

Federal judicial service

He was confirmed by the United States Senate on June 24, 1910, and received his commission the same day. He assumed senior status on October 6, 1928, serving in that capacity until his death on September 13, 1938.

Personal

Killits was married to Alice Nourse Steuart, June 21, 1887, in Washington, D.C., and had two daughters.

Memberships

Killits was a member of several Quadrennial General Conferences of the Methodist Episcopal Church. He was a Mason, Chi Psi, Phi Delta Phi, Knights of Pythias, and a Republican.

Other interests

Killits had hobbies including carpentry, motor boating, the study of sociology and the history of the bible.

References

Sources

 

1858 births
1938 deaths
Ohio state court judges
Judges of the United States District Court for the Northern District of Ohio
United States district court judges appointed by William Howard Taft
20th-century American judges
People from Bryan, Ohio
County district attorneys in Ohio
Williams College alumni
George Washington University Law School alumni
People from Lithopolis, Ohio
Lawyers from Toledo, Ohio
Ohio Republicans
19th-century American newspaper publishers (people)
People from Red Oak, Iowa